Thornwood is an unincorporated community in Pocahontas County, West Virginia, United States. Thornwood is on the East Fork of the Greenbrier River. US Route 250 passes approximately one-half mile to the south.

References

Unincorporated communities in Pocahontas County, West Virginia
Unincorporated communities in West Virginia